In mathematics, convolution is a binary operation on functions.

Kinds
 Circular convolution
 Convolution theorem
 Titchmarsh convolution theorem
 Dirichlet convolution
 Infimal convolution
 Logarithmic convolution
 Vandermonde convolution

Applications
 Convolution, in digital image processing, with a Kernel (image processing)
 Convolutional code, in telecommunication
 Convolution of probability distributions
 Convolution reverb, a process used for digitally simulating the reverberation of a physical or virtual space
 Convolution random number generator, a pseudo-random number sampling method that can be used to generate random variates from certain classes of probability distribution

See also
 Convolute (disambiguation)